Jože Vidmar (born 27 February 1963 in Ljubljana) is a Yugoslav-born, Slovenian slalom canoeist who competed from the early 1980s to the mid-1990s. He won three medals at the ICF Canoe Slalom World Championships with a gold (C1 team: 1993) and two bronzes (C1: 1983, C1 team: 1989).

Vidmar also finished 14th in the C1 event at the 1992 Summer Olympics in Barcelona.

World Cup individual podiums

References

1963 births
Canoeists at the 1992 Summer Olympics
Living people
Olympic canoeists of Slovenia
Slovenian male canoeists
Yugoslav male canoeists
Sportspeople from Ljubljana
Medalists at the ICF Canoe Slalom World Championships